PKP class EM10 is a class of Polish electric locomotives used by the Polish railway operator Polskie Koleje Państwowe (PKP). They were built for shunting purposes.

History
Designed in 1988, the EM10 was intended to function as a shunting locomotive and short distance passenger locomotive. Only four prototypes were built, they were operated by PKP. In 2004, they were modernised by ZNLE Gliwice.

The locomotives last ran in 2009, since then they were stored at the Poznań Franowo depot. In 2021 three were scrapped, one will be offered to a museum or a rolling stock collection.

Locomotive assignment
''

See also
PKP classification system

References

External links
EM10 picture gallery at railfaneurope.net

Bo′Bo′ locomotives
3000 V DC locomotives
EM10